UAAP Season 59 is the 1996–97 season of the University Athletic Association of the Philippines, which was hosted by De La Salle University-Manila. The season opened on July 13, 1996, at the Araneta Coliseum. The 3rd Annual UAAP Cheerdance Competition was also held after the opening ceremonies.

Basketball

Men's tournament

Elimination round

Playoffs

Championships summary

Seniors' division championships

Juniors' division championships

Overall championship race
The host school is boldfaced. Final.

Juniors' division

Seniors' division
 

Note for Seniors division: Point totals in italics are partial results. The results for the Men and Women's Judo tournaments, in which only Ateneo, La Salle, UP, and UST joined in, are incomplete. UP won both tournaments. Fencing is a demonstration sport, and is not included in the final tally.

Individual awards
Top Athletes: 
Men:  Herminio Gallo, Jr. (Volleyball)
Women:  Emmilyn Ong Jimenez (Swimming)
Junior:  Rufino Manotok (Swimming)

References
Tigers, Archers seal 3rd straight title showdown, Manila Standard
UST Tigers take Game 1 vs Archers, Manila Standard
Four-rific!, Manila Standard

External links
WebArchive - UAAP Season 59 hosted by DLSU-Manila
WebArchive - UAAP Online '96

 
1996 in multi-sport events
1996 in Philippine sport
59